The third season of the American television series Warehouse 13 premiered on July 11, 2011, on Syfy. The season consists of 13 episodes; the first twelve episodes of the season aired on Mondays at 9 pm, though the Christmas special aired on a Tuesday. The show stars Eddie McClintock, Joanne Kelly, Saul Rubinek, Allison Scagliotti and Genelle Williams.

Cast

Main
 Eddie McClintock as Pete Lattimer
 Joanne Kelly as Myka Bering
 Saul Rubinek as Artie Nielsen
 Allison Scagliotti as Claudia Donovan
 Genelle Williams as Leena

Special guest
 Anthony Michael Hall as Walter Sykes

Recurring
 C. C. H. Pounder as Mrs. Irene Frederic
 Roger Rees as James MacPherson
 Jaime Murray as Helena G. Wells
 Aaron Ashmore as Steve Jinks
 Kate Mulgrew as Jane Lattimer
 Sasha Roiz as Marcus Diamond
 Ashley Williams as Sally Stukowski
 Faran Tahir as Adwin Kosan

Guest
 Jeri Ryan as Amanda Lattimer
 René Auberjonois as Hugo Miller
 Alessandra Torresani as Meagan
 Lindsay Wagner as Dr. Vanessa Calder
 Neil Grayston as Douglas Fargo
 Gareth David-Lloyd as William Wollcott
 Steven Yeun as Gibson Rice
 Gabriel Hogan as Sam Martino
 Erick Avari as Caturanga
 Susan Hogan as Jeannie Bering

Production
On October 5, 2010, the Syfy network announced that Warehouse 13 had been picked up for a third season of 13 new episodes, set to premiere on July 11, 2011. Aaron Ashmore joined the cast this season as ATF agent Steve Jinks. On March 22, 2011, Syfy announced that they would air another Christmas special of Warehouse 13 during season three.

A ten part webisode series, entitled "Of Monsters and Men", premiered on Syfy.com on July 5, 2011.

Episodes

DVD release

References

General references

External links

 
 

3
2011 American television seasons

es:Anexo:Episodios de Warehouse 13